Bostrychia is a genus of filamentous red alga.  Species may grow as epiphytes on other plants in salt marsh and mangrove habitats.

Species 
Accepted species

 Bostrychia anomala J.A.West, S.Loiseaux de Goër & G.C.Zuccarello
 Bostrychia arbuscula W.H.Harvey  
 Bostrychia binderi Harvey
 Bostrychia bipinnata Harvey ex J.Agardh 
 Bostrychia bispora J.West & G.Zuccarello
 Bostrychia bryophila Zanardini  
 Bostrychia calliptera (Montagne) Montagne 
 Bostrychia cornigera Montagne  
 Bostrychia disticha J.Agardh 
 Bostrychia flagellifera Post 
 Bostrychia fulcrata Zanardini
 Bostrychia glomerata J.Agardh
 Bostrychia gracilis (R.J.King & Puttock) Zuccarello & J.A.West 
 Bostrychia harveyi Montagne  
 Bostrychia hongkongensis C.K.Tseng 
 Bostrychia intricata (Bory) Montagne 
 Bostrychia jelineckii Grunow
 Bostrychia kaernbachii Grunow
 Bostrychia kelanensis Grunow
 Bostrychia kingii Zuccarello, J.A.West & M.Kamiya 
 Bostrychia lepida Montagne 
 Bostrychia leptoclada Montagne  
 Bostrychia mamillosa Kützing  
 Bostrychia monosiphonia Montagne
 Bostrychia montagnei Harvey 
 Bostrychia moritziana (Sonder ex Kützing) J.Agardh 
 Bostrychia nigrescens F.v.Mueller
 Bostrychia pannosa J.Agardh
 Bostrychia pauperula Grunow
 Bostrychia pilulifera Montagne
 Bostrychia radicans (Montagne) Montagne  
 Bostrychia radicosa (Itono) J.A.West, G.C.Zuccarello & M.H.Hommersand 
 Bostrychia scorpioides (Hudson) Montagne - type
 Bostrychia sertularia Montagne 
 Bostrychia siliquis J.Agardh 
 Bostrychia simpliciuscula Harvey ex J.Agardh 
 Bostrychia sonderiana Grunow
 Bostrychia tangatensis Post
 Bostrychia tenella (J.V.Lamouroux) J.Agardh
 Bostrychia vaga J.D.Hooker & Harvey
 Bostrychia wardii W.H.Harvey ex J.Agardh

References

Epiphytes
Rhodomelaceae
Red algae genera
Taxa named by Camille Montagne